Aeonium balsamiferum is a species of tropical flowering plant in the family Crassulaceae. The species is endemic in the Canary Islands.

Taxonomy
The plant was first described by Philip Barker Webb and Sabin Berthelot, published in Natural History of the Canary Islands (Histoire Naturelle des Îles Canaries) in 1840.

Description
It is a shrub with sticky leaves. It has light yellow flowers.

Distribution
Aeonium balsamiferum occurs in the eastern Canary Islands of Lanzarote (native) and Fuerteventura (naturalised), in shrublands and rocky areas.

References

balsamiferum
Endemic flora of the Canary Islands